Haywards Heath East is an electoral division of West Sussex in the United Kingdom, and returns one member to sit on West Sussex County Council.

Extent
The division covers the eastern part of the town of Haywards Heath.

It comprises the following Mid Sussex District wards: Haywards Heath Bentswood Ward and Haywards Heath Franklands Ward; and of the eastern part of the civil parish of Haywards Heath.

On 31 October 2013 John de Mierre died, this necessitated the holding of a bye-election, which was held on 19 December 2013

Election results

2013 Bye-election
Results of the bye-election held on 19 December 2013:

2013 Election
Results of the election held on 2 May 2013:

2009 Election
Results of the election held on 4 June 2009:

2005 Election
Results of the election held on 5 May 2005:

References

Election Results - West Sussex County Council

External links
 West Sussex County Council
 Election Maps

Electoral Divisions of West Sussex
Haywards Heath